Richard "Richar" Abril (born 10 August 1982 in Cuba) is a Cuban professional boxer.

Professional career
Most Cuban boxers have defected to go professional over the past few years amid considerable fanfare for outstanding amateur careers. However, this wasn’t the case for Abril, a very good former amateur in his own right, having fought over 200 bouts. Unlike his countrymen who can’t return to the island, he is still able to return regularly to Cuba and spend time with friends and family. Several years ago, Abril won a lottery system, allowing him to freely come and go to and from Cuba. At the age of 23, Abril made his professional debut against Carlos Pena.

On October 22, 2011, Abril defeated Miguel Acosta by twelfth-round unanimous decision for the interim WBA Lightweight title.

After a proposed bout with Cuban superstar Yuriorkis Gamboa fell through, Brandon Rios agreed to face off with Richar Abril on April 14, 2012 in Las Vegas. In a controversial split-decision, Rios maintained his winning streak despite most fans and analysts believing Abril comprehensively won the fight.

Professional boxing record

References

External links

 
 
 

|-

|-

|-

1982 births
Living people
Lightweight boxers
World Boxing Association champions
Cuban male boxers